The United States Marine Corps Designated Marksman Rifle (DMR, NSN 1005-01-458-6235; more formally the United States Rifle, Caliber 7.62 mm, M14, DMR) is a semi-automatic, gas-operated rifle chambered for the 7.62×51mm NATO cartridge. It is a modified version of the M14 rifle formerly used by the United States Marine Corps. The USMC Precision Weapons Section at Marine Corps Base Quantico built all DMRs.

The Marine Corps replaced the DMR with the M39 Enhanced Marksman Rifle on a one-for-one basis.

History
In 1989, the USMC began a program to upgrade M14s not decommissioned into DMRs by designing them with fiberglass stocks and new barrels. This was done by the Precision Weapons Section.

Design
The DMR was issued with match-grade M118LR 175-grain Long Range ammunition. It can have various scopes attached on the upper receiver, including the AN/PVS-4 Starlight scope, via picatinny rail.

The DMR can fire precisely up to 1,000 yards if M118LR special ball ammo is used.

The "basic" DMR (i.e., without secondary sight, magazine, sling, basic issue items, cleaning gear, suppressor and bipod) weighs  or less. 

The DMR design facilitates repairing or replacing of the sight mount, barrel, bolt, and other key assemblies at the third echelon maintenance level.

Specifications
There are several notable differences between the basic M14 and the DMR.

Barrel: A  stainless steel, match-grade barrel by Krieger Barrels, Inc.
Stock: McMillan Tactical M2A fiberglass stock. This particular stock features a pistol grip and a buttstock with adjustable saddle cheekpiece.
Optics: An over-action MIL-STD-1913 Picatinny rail allows for the use of any optic compatible with the rail; this includes a rather large variety of military scopes and imaging devices.
Muzzle device: Most DMRs utilize the traditional M14 muzzle device, although since deployment in 2001, some DMRs are now equipped with the OPS, Inc. 2-port muzzle brake, which is threaded and collared to accept an OPS-Inc. 12th Model sound suppressor.
Bipod: A Harris S-L bipod is used on the USMC DMR.

Combat use

The DMR was previously used by Marine Corps FAST Companies and by the 4th Marine Expeditionary Brigade (Anti-Terrorism). Explosive Ordnance Disposal Teams use them to safely shoot at mines or other types of explosives that cannot be disarmed from a safe distance.

The DMR was previously used by USMC Scout Sniper Teams.

See also 
The M21 and M25 Sniper Weapons Systems, also based on the M14
United States Army Squad Designated Marksman Rifle
M110 Semi-Automatic Sniper System

References

Bibliography
 
 

7.62×51mm NATO semi-automatic rifles
Designated marksman rifles
Rifles of the United States
United States Marine Corps equipment